Polandale is an unincorporated community in Wood County, West Virginia, United States.

The name of the community is derived from the early settlers being natives of Poland.

References 

Unincorporated communities in West Virginia
Unincorporated communities in Wood County, West Virginia